Luca Cattapani was an Italian painter of the late-Renaissance period, active in his native Cremona. He was born about the year 1570, and was a pupil of one of the Campi. He painted a Decollation of St. John for the church of San Donato at Cremona.

Sources

1570s births
16th-century Italian painters
Italian male painters
Painters from Cremona
Renaissance painters
Year of death unknown